Indyk is a surname. Notable people with the surname include:

Ivor Indyk (born 1949), Australian literary academic, editor and publisher. Older brother of Martin Indyk.
Martin Indyk (born 1951), American diplomat and foreign relations analyst. Younger brother of Ivor Indyk.
Piotr Indyk, Polish computer scientist

Jewish surnames